This is an index of topics related to climbing.

A
Abseil
- Acetazolamide
- Action Directe
- Altitude sickness (also known as: Acute mountain sickness (AMS))
- Aid climbing
- Aider
- Alcove (climbing)
- knot
- Alpine hut
- Alpine style
- Anchor (climbing)
- Angle (climbing)
- Arête
- Ascension (climbing)
- Australian rappel
- Avalanche

B
Ball-nuts
- Base camp
- Bat hook
- Belay
- Belay device
- Belay slave
- Belay station
- Big wall climb
- Birdbeak
- Bivouac or Bivi
- Black ice
- Blue ice
- Boreal
- Boulder
- Bouldering
- Bowline
- Bowline on a bight
- Bowyangs
- Buildering
- Butterfly knot

C
Cam
- Campus (see campus board)
- Campus board
- Carabiner or Biner
- Chimney (see Chimneying)
- Chimneying
- Chipped hold
- Chipping
- Choss
- Chute
- Cirque
- Clean climbing
- Cliff
- Climbing area
- Climbing command
- Climbing equipment
- Climbing gym
- Climbing harness
- Climbing injuries
- Climbing route
- Climbing shoe
- Climbing technique
- Climbing wall
- Clove hitch
- Col
- Couloir
- Copperhead (climbing)
- Cord
- Corner (climbing)
- Cornice
- Crack climbing
- Crag
- Crampons
- Crevasse
- Crimp (climbing)

D
Daisy chain
- Deaf climbers
- Deepelling
- Deep-water soloing
- Diamox
- Dihedral
- Dry-tooling
- Dynamic rope
- Dyno (climbing)

E
Edging
- Enchainment
- Etriers
- European Death Knot
- Exposure
- Eight-thousander
- Expedition style

F
Face climbing
- Fifi hook
- Figure-eight knot
- Figure-of-eight loop
- Fisherman's knot
- Fist jam
- Fixed rope
- Flared
- Flash (rock climbing)
- Flute (climbing)
- The Fly
- Free climbing
- Free soloing
- Friend (climbing)
- Front pointing

G
Gaiters
- Gamow bag
- Gaston
- Gendarme
- Glissade
- Glossary of climbing terms
- Grade (climbing)
- Grade (bouldering)
- Grip
- Guide

H
Harness
- Heinous
- Helmet
- Himalayan Mountaineering Institute
- Himalayan Trust
- Hypothermia
- Hypoxia

I
Ice axe
- Icefall
- Incut (climbing hold)
- Indoor climbing
- International Federation of Sport Climbing

J
Jamming
- Jug (climbing hold)
- Jumar

K
Knifeblade
- Knot

L
Lead climbing
- Lead climbing injuries
- Ledge
- Limestone
- Lost Arrow Spire

M
The Mandala
- Mantle
- Massif
- Match
- Metolius
- Mixed climbing
- Moraine
- Mountain hut
- Mountain rescue
- Mountaineering
- Mountaineering equipment
- Multi-pitch climbing
- Munter hitch

N
Nailing a route
- Nut

O
Off-width
- Open book
- On-sight climbing
- On-sight flash climbing
- Overhand bend
- Overhand knot
- Overhang

P
Pendulum
- Pitch (vertical space)
- Piton
- Pocket (climbing hold)
- Portaledge
- Protection (climbing)
- Prusik
- Pumped

Q
Quickdraw

R
RP
- Rappel or Rap, Rapping, Roping down
- Realization
- Redpoint
- Recreational Tree climbing
- Retro-bolting
- Rivet
- Rock climbing
- Rock Hopping
- Roof (climbing)
- Rope
- Rotten rock
- Route climbing

S
Sandbagging (climbing)
- Scrambling
- Second
- Securing a climb
- Self-arrest
- Self-belay
- Self-locking device
- Self-rescue
- Sherpa (people), see Sherpa (disambiguation)
- Siege style
- Sierra Club
- Ski mountaineering
- Slab climbing
- Sling
- Smearing
- Snow cave
- Solo climbing
- Spindrift
- Sport climbing
- Spring-loaded camming device (SLCD)
- Static rope or line
- Stopper

T
Talus
- Top rope climbing
- Top rope
- Topo
- Traditional climbing
- Traverse (climbing)

U
UIAA

V

W
Webbing
- White ice
- Windslab
- Wired

Y
Yosemite Decimal System

See also

 Glossary of climbing terms – climbing jargon.
 List of climbers – people associated with climbing.

 

Climbing topics

Climbing